Seo Dong-hyeon (born June 2, 2003), known professionally as Big Naughty (stylized as BIG Naughty), is a South Korean rapper and songwriter. He first garnered attention when he appeared on the rap competition TV show Show Me the Money 8 in 2019. He signed to H1ghr Music where he released the extended plays Bucket List (2021) and Nangman (2022).

Early life
Seo Dong-hyeon was born on June 2, 2003. He graduated from Daewon Foreign Language High School.

Career

2019–2020: Show Me the Money 8 and signing to H1ghr Music
In July 2019, Big Naughty appeared on the rap competition TV show Show Me the Money 8 where he first garnered attention. He released singles "Bada", "Problems", "010" and "Astronaut" on the show and finished in fourth place. In October 2019, he signed to H1ghr Music. In November 2019, he released his debut single "Where It All Started Remix." In 2020, he participated in H1ghr Music's compilation albums H1ghr: Red Tape and H1ghr: Blue Tape, which were later nominated as Hip-hop Album of the Year at the Korean Hip-hop Awards.

2021–present: Bucket List, Nangman and Hopeless Romantic
In 2021, Big Naughty released his debut extended play Bucket List. In January 2022, he was nominated as New Artist of the Year at the Korean Hip-hop Awards. In June 2022, he released the R&B extended play Nangman. In July 2022, he appeared on the record producing competition TV show Listen Up.

Artistry 
Big Naughty is known for his "singing rap" style. He considers himself more of an R&B singer than a rapper. He cited rapper Beenzino as his biggest influence.

Discography

Extended plays

Singles

As lead artist

As featured artist

Soundtrack appearances

Other charted songs

Filmography

Television shows

Web shows

Awards and nominations

Notes

References

External links
 

2003 births
Living people
Show Me the Money (South Korean TV series) contestants
South Korean male rappers
21st-century South Korean male singers